Clockwork Zoo, (formerly Octagon CSI), based in Cape Town, South Africa, was South Africa's largest animation studio from 2005 until its closure in 2011.

After creating the local action-adventure teen show Urbo: The Adventures of Pax Afrika, the company produced the animation for several international television series, including the fifth season of Caillou co-produced with Loogaroo Animation Studio, and the Cookie Jar Group, Mr. Baby for Xilam, and the Playhouse Disney series Florrie's Dragons, co-produced by Wish Films.

History

2005-2008: Early Career
Clockwork Zoo is Africa's largest animation studio and home to several of South Africa's most prolific storytellers and content creators. Starting in 2005 with URBO: The Adventures of Pax Afrika, the young animation division quickly grew to 30 people, producing 104 half-hour episodes. After a move from local to more international work and a change from Flash to Toon Boom as preferred medium, the studio worked on Mr Bebe (Xilam, France), Happy Valley (Dinamo, Wales) and storyboards for Wibbly Pig (Wish Films, UK).

2008-2011: Later Career
In 2010, Clockwork Zoo co-produced 26 season 5 half-hour episodes of Caillou with Cookie Jar Entertainment (Canada), and Loogaroo Animation Studio (Canada) significantly raising the bar on previous seasons. The Caillou franchise has sold in every continent and made $40 million in sales so far.

In 2010, the company co-produced Florrie's Dragons with Wish Films (UK) for initial broadcast on the Disney Channel UK. The 52 x 10 min series about a princess and her 6 pet dragons has gained a great deal of attention, and Playhouse Disney were "thrilled" with the result. Clockwork Zoo provided development, design, script, storyboard, build, background, animatics, layout, animation and HD video post on Florries Dragons.

The company closed in 2011 and many of the employees formed Sea Monster Entertainment.

Awards
The company won the prestigious 2010 Cape Film Commission Imbongi trophies in both Training & Development and Animation.

References

External links
Clockwork Zoo Official Website
Clockwork Zoo on IMDb
Clockwork Zoo on AnimationSA

Companies based in Cape Town
South African animation studios